Barton Lodge, also known as Malvern Hall and French House, is a historic home located near Hot Springs, Bath County, Virginia.  It was built in 1898–1900, and is a -story, five bay, double pile, Classical Revival style frame dwelling. It features a hipped roof with two hipped-roofed dormers on the north and south elevations and a temple
front featuring a pedimented portico supported by Corinthian order columns.  It has a one-story, flat-roofed, four-bay west wing. The house is situated on French's Hill overlooking The Homestead.  Lettie Pate Whitehead Evans (1872-1953) purchased Barton Lodge in October 1927, and renamed it Malvern Hall.  Subsequent to her death in 1953, her Foundation made a gift of the Malvern Hall property in 1961 to St. Luke's Episcopal Church in Hot Springs.

It was added to the National Register of Historic Places in 2013.

References

Houses on the National Register of Historic Places in Virginia
Neoclassical architecture in Virginia
Houses completed in 1900
Houses in Bath County, Virginia
National Register of Historic Places in Bath County, Virginia
1900 establishments in Virginia